is a 1958 Japanese fantasy film directed by Eisuke Takizawa. It was entered into the 8th Berlin International Film Festival.  The screenplay was based on a novel, Koya hijiri by Kyoka Izumi. The film was in CinemaScope and Eastman Color. It was not dubbed in English, but was distributed internationally in May 1963 in subtitled format.

Cast
 Yumeji Tsukioka - The Temptress
 Ryoji Hayama - Socho, the Monk
 Tadashi Kobayashi - The Dwarf/husband
 Ichijirô Oya - Grandfather
 Jun Hamamura - The Criminal
 Akitake Kôno 
 Junko Miyazono

References

External links

1958 films
1950s fantasy films
1950s Japanese-language films
Japanese fantasy films
Films directed by Eisuke Takizawa
1950s Japanese films